The Twenty-Ninth Wisconsin Legislature convened from  to  in regular session.

Senators representing even-numbered districts were newly elected for this session and were serving the first year of a two-year term. Assembly members were elected to a one-year term. Assembly members and even-numbered senators were elected in the general election of November 2, 1875. Senators representing odd-numbered districts were serving the second year of their two-year term, having been elected in the general election held on November 3, 1874.

Major events
 January 3, 1876: Inauguration of Harrison Ludington as the 13th Governor of Wisconsin.
 February 2, 1876: The National League of Professional Base Ball Clubs was founded at a meeting in Chicago.
 March 7, 1876: Alexander Graham Bell was granted a United States patent for the telephone.
 March 27, 1876: The United States Supreme Court decided the case United States v. Reese, narrowing the scope of the Fifteenth Amendment to the United States Constitution, and enabling the creation of new laws to limit the voting rights of African Americans.  On the same day, the court also decided the case United States v. Cruikshank, significantly limiting the power of the federal government to enforce civil rights protections.
 June 25June 26, 1876: 300 men of the 7th U.S. Cavalry Regiment were killed by a force of Lakota, Cheyenne, and Arapaho at the Battle of the Little Bighorn.
 July 4, 1876: United States Centennial.
 November 7, 1876: The 1876 United States presidential election was held.  Rutherford B. Hayes was the apparent winner of the electoral college votes, but the results were bitterly disputed due to various fraud schemes in southern states, and the fact that Samuel J. Tilden was the apparent winner of the popular vote.

Major legislation
 March 13, 1876: An Act to apportion the state into senate and assembly districts, 1876 Act 343.

Party summary

Senate summary

Assembly summary

Sessions
 1st Regular session: January 12, 1876March 14, 1876

Leaders

Senate leadership
 President of the Senate: Charles D. Parker (D)
 President pro tempore: Robert L. D. Potter (R)

Assembly leadership
 Speaker of the Assembly: Sam S. Fifield (R)

Members

Members of the Senate
Members of the Senate for the Twenty-Ninth Wisconsin Legislature:

Members of the Assembly
Members of the Assembly for the Twenty-Ninth Wisconsin Legislature:

Employees

Senate employees
 Chief Clerk: Andrew Jackson Turner
 Assistant Clerk: J. F. A. Williams
 Bookkeeper: J. T. Huntington
 Engrossing Clerk: Ms. Georgie Clise
 Enrolling Clerk: J. T. Jacobson
 Transcribing Clerk: Ed. Borcherdt
 Sergeant-at-Arms: R. T. Gardner
 Assistant Sergeant-at-Arms: George Hawley
 Postmaster: D. McBride
 Assistant Postmaster: C. A. Carter
 Gallery Attendant: R. B. Winsor
 Assistant Attendant: A. T. Conger
 Committee Room Attendants: 
 H. A. Head
 Alfred Newgent
 C. H. Newton
 Doorkeepers: 
 M. Lynch
 T. Torkelson
 S. F. Leavitt
 Hohn Hallahan
 Porter: T. H. Hanson
 Janitor: P. Gilluly
 Messengers: 
 Arthur A. Hills
 Sherman G. Potter
 Daniel Trainer
 Herbert Rinder
 Eugene Abbott
 Fred Richards
 George Gewicke
 Lucien Pickarts
 Willie Scampton

Assembly employees
 Chief Clerk: Rollin M. Strong
 Assistant Clerk: Chester Deming Long
 Bookkeeper: William M. Fogo
 Engrossing Clerk: Mrs. Fannie Vilas
 Enrolling Clerk: R. A. Gillett
 Transcribing Clerk: J. P. Cooper
 Clerk for the Committee on Judiciary: Frank O. Wisner
 Sergeant-at-Arms: Elisha Starr
 Assistant Sergeant-at-Arms: George H. Osgood
 Postmaster: John H. Manschot
 Assistant Postmaster: Fred M. Griswold
 Doorkeepers: 
 Henry Matthews
 William F. Shallock
 T. E. Abbott
 E. S. Chase
 Committee Room Attendants:
 John Hannon
 W. H. Bell
 W. R. Kent
 Richard Prichard
 Gallery Attendants:
 W. Alten
 Frank Burgess
 Porter: W. F. Bingman
 Night Watch: C. F. Ainsworth
 Fireman: Thomas Nelson
 Speaker's Messenger: Charles Weight
 Chief Clerk's Messenger: Theo. Thorson
 Sergeant-at-Arms' Messenger: M. L. Parker
 Messengers:
 Willie Betts
 Walter Holt
 Joseph Ready
 Mark Baker
 Harry Meeker
 B. B. Jones
 Lyman Curtis
 James DeBauker
 Willie Plumb
 Julius Voltz
 Lucius Cannon
 Freddie D. Fagg
 Henry Delaney

References

External links
 1876: Related Documents from Wisconsin Legislature

1876 in Wisconsin
Wisconsin
Wisconsin legislative sessions